Pro-Música Brasil (PMB), previously Associação Brasileira dos Produtores de Discos (ABPD) (English: Brazilian Association of Record Producers), is an official representative body of the record labels in the Brazilian phonographic market.

History 
The Brazilian Association of Record Producers, ABPD, was set up in April 1958 and represents the largest phonogram producers established in Brazil. In 2016, the ABPD was renamed Pro-Música Brasil.

Activities
The priorities of the ABPD are to develop conditions to assist the industry in preserving the music market and developing new markets and music marketing technologies, as well as fighting online piracy and promoting appropriate legislation in the areas of copyright and neighboring right, in addition to promoting awareness of music as a cultural and economic value. Furthermore, the ABPD is engaged in conciliating the interests of the companies it represents with those of other title-holders in the area of copyright, as well as gathering statistical data and conducting market research and surveys. The ABPD is affiliated to the umbrella association, the International Federation of the Phonographic Industry (IFPI), with over 1,400 member companies in 66 countries.

The ABPD is also responsible for the issuance of certification awards authorized by recording companies, in recognition of the work of performers, through the awarding of "special discs", i.e. Gold, Platinum and Diamond Discs, for units sold. In the anti-piracy area, the ABPD established the "Association for the Protection of the Intellectual Property Rights of the Phonographic Industry", APDIF, in 1995, and this body is involved since then in the fight against music piracy in their operational, logistic and legal aspects.

Affiliates 
All companies associated with Pro-Música Brasil:

 EMI-Odeon, EMI Fênix, EMI Jangada, EMI Imperador - EMI Music - EMI Records. 
 Microservice Tecnologia Digital.
 MK Music.
 Edições Paulinas.
 Record Produções e Gravações Ltda.
 Line Records.
 New Music.
 Som Livre.
 Sony Music.
 Universal Music.
 Walt Disney Records.
 Warner Music.
 Continental EastWest.

Sales certification
Before 1990, there were no music certification award in Brazil. Following that, the certification levels were:

Brazilian (domestic) artists
CD

DVD

International artists
CD

DVD

Digital media certification 
From November 2008, digital media sales were also certified by APBD with the following certification levels:
Domestic
Gold: 50,000 
Platinum: 100,000 
Diamond: 500,000 
International
Gold: 30,000
Platinum: 60,000
Diamond: 250,000

Digital certifications were active for both albums (digital álbum, or DAL) and singles (digital música or DMS), using the same certification levels. Physical CD sales continued to be certified separately. The last digital certification for singles was awarded by APBD in 2013 while the last digital album was thus certified in 2015. 

Starting in 2017, the certifications for digital sales were united with those of actual sales with the following rules. For the sake of album certifications, paid digital downloads of full albums are equal to a physical album sale. Paid digital downloads of singles from the album are also counted for album certification, where ten singles downloads are equivalent to one album sale. For audio and video streams of one or more tracks in the album, 5,000 streams are equivalent to one album. Single certifications are based on digital download. For audio and video streaming, 500 streams are equal to one download. The thresholds for both album and single certifications are the ones previously assigned to CDs.

List of Diamond certified albums
The following is a list of albums that have been certified Diamond or more by Pro-Música Brasil (and previously Associação Brasileira dos Produtores de Discos).

Quadruple Diamond
Ágape Musical

Triple Diamond
21
Músicas para Louvar ao SenhorSó Pra ContrariarDouble DiamondAdele: Live at the Royal Albert HallAs Quatro EstaçõesÉ o Tchan do BrasilExtraordinário Amor de DeusI Am... Sasha FierceMarília Mendonça - Ao VivoMinha BençãoNa Cabeça e na CinturaO que é que eu sou sem Jesus?Paula Fernandes ao VivoTerra Samba ao Vivo e a CoresTodos os Cantos Vol. 1 (Marília Mendonça)VidaDiamond25Acústico - Ao Vivo (Bruno & Marrone)Acústico MTV (Cássia Eller)Acustico MTV (Kid Abelha)Acústico MTV (Legião Urbana)Acústico MTV (Roberto Carlos)Acústico MTV (Titãs)Ágape Amor DivinoÁguas PurificadorasAlô
Amor sem LimiteAo Vivo Em Campo GrandeAo Vivo Em GoiâniaAs Super NovasBack to BlackBanda Eva Ao VivoBangBeyoncéBita e os AnimaisBrincadeira de CriançaBruno & Marrone Ao VivoCalangoCamilaClássicos SertanejosConquistasO Canto da CidadeO Céu Explica TudoO Clone InternacionalComo. Sempre Feito. NuncaDanielDeixa EntrarÉ o Tchan no HawaíO Embaixador (Ao Vivo)Equilíbrio Distante
Galinha Pintadinha 4
Inevitável
KLB
Laços de Família Internacional'Leandro & Leonardo Vol. 7O Maior TroféuMamonas AssassinasMemórias, Crônicas, e Declarações de AmorMeu Presente é VocêMotionMTV ao Vivo (Ivete Sangalo)My WorldsPerfilPreciso de TiPrenda MinhaO Samba PoconéQuatro Estações Ao VivoQue País É EsteRoberto Carlos (1995)Roberto Carlos (1996)Sale el Sol Sexto SentidoSom de AdoradoresTá Delicia Tá Gostoso
Terra do Nunca
Tem Moda Pra Tudo
Thank U, Next
Toca Lulu
Torre de Babel Internacional
Tribalistas
Um Presente Para Jesus
Um Sonhador
VibrasZezé Di Camargo & Luciano 1993Zezé Di Camargo & Luciano 1994Zezé Di Camargo & Luciano 1995Zezé Di Camargo & Luciano 1996Zezé Di Camargo & Luciano 1997Zezé Di Camargo & Luciano 1998Zezé Di Camargo & Luciano 1999Zezé Di Camargo & Luciano 2000''

References

External links 
  

Music industry associations
Communications and media organisations based in Brazil
Mass media companies of Brazil
Pro-Música Brasil
Mass media in Rio de Janeiro (city)
1958 establishments in Brazil